Giacomo De Martino (21 September 1849 – 23 November 1921) was an Italian politician, who was governor in the Italian colonies.

Biography

Born in London in 1849 from a rich Italian family. He was one of the main supporters of the Italian colonialism since he was young. Initially he was a diplomat, but soon started to do a political career. In 1905 he was elected at the Italian Senate. In 1906 De Martino created the Istituto coloniale italiano, in order to promote the development of the Italian colonies and their management.

He had held several colonial posts as he had been a governor of the Italian colonies of Somaliland (1910–1916), Eritrea (1916–1919), and finally Cyrenaica (1919–1921), where he had died at office.

See also
 Italian empire

Notes

Bibliography
 Istituto coloniale italiano. Rivista coloniale, Volumi 1-2. Editore ICI. Roma, 1906

External links
 

1849 births
1921 deaths
Italian colonial governors and administrators
Knights Grand Cross of the Order of Saints Maurice and Lazarus
Members of the Senate of the Kingdom of Italy